The designation B.II was used for two completely unrelated aircraft produced by Fokker:

 The Fokker M.10s flown by Austria-Hungary during World War I (named B.II by the Austro-Hungarian military)
 A biplane flying boat flown by the Dutch Navy in the 1920s (named B.II by Fokker)